Austeria (aka The Inn) is a Polish feature film directed by Jerzy Kawalerowicz, produced by Zespół Filmowy "Kadr" and released in 1983.

Austeria takes place during the opening days of World War I, in the Austro-Hungarian province of Galicia. Tag, played by Franciszek Pieczka, is a Jewish innkeeper whose inn (austeria means inn in the Polish dialect) is located near the border with the Russian Empire. War has broken out and local civilians are fleeing the advancing Russian Army. A number of refugees have taken shelter in Tag's inn for the night. A group of Hasidic Jews from the neighboring village arrive, followed by an Austrian baroness, and a Hungarian hussar, cut off from his army unit.

The film is based on a 1966 novel of the same name by Julian Stryjkowski, who collaborated with Kawalerowicz on the screenplay.

Cast
 Franciszek Pieczka as Tag
 Wojciech Pszoniak as Josele
 Jan Szurmiej as the cantor
 Ewa Domanska as Asia
 Wojciech Standello as the tzaddik
 Liliana Komorowska as Jewdocha
 Szymon Szurmiej as Wilf
 Gołda Tencer as Blanka
 Marek Wilk as Bum Kramer
 Gerard Ojeda as the Hungarian officer
 Zofia Saretok as the baroness
 Stanislaw Igar as Apfelgrun
 Feliks Szajnert as Gerson
 Mieczysław Bram as Wohl
 Jan Hencz as Pritsch

See also 
 Cinema of Poland
 List of Polish language films

External links
 

1983 films
Polish World War I films
Films directed by Jerzy Kawalerowicz
World War I films set on the Eastern Front
1980s Polish-language films
Films set in Austria-Hungary
Films about Jews and Judaism